Rancho Guejito  (pronounced wa-hee-to) is a  Mexican land grant in Southern California, approximately seven miles east of Escondido.  The ranch has expanded to a total of 22,359 acres through its purchases of adjacent land.  It is among the last Mexican land grants (along with Rancho Santa Margarita y Las Flores) still a single parcel of land.

History
In 1845, the  Rancho Guejito y Cañada de Palomia was granted by Mexican Governor Pio Pico to customs inspector and Justice of the Peace José María Orozco.

In 1974, the state parks division recommended acquiring Rancho Guejito as a park and nature reserve, but the purchase was vetoed by incoming Gov. Jerry Brown due to the cost. In 1974, industrialist Benjamin Coates purchased the land for $10 million. Since then, the land has remained mostly undeveloped and used as a cattle ranch.

Coates died in 2004. The land is owned by The Rodney Company, headed by Coates's daughter Theodate Coates.

Between 2003 and 2007, approximately 93 percent of the area was burned in several wildfires. An October 22, 2007 fire that began in the San Pasqual Valley near Guejito Creek, which is across the highway from Rancho Guejito, was dubbed the "Guejito Fire." The Guejito Fire merged into the Witch Fire early on October 22, which went on to burn homes in Rancho Bernardo and resulted in two deaths. The fires later resulted in settlements from utilities related to power lines that ignited the fire.

Modern development of the Rancho
The ranch taps a water supply deep below the surface of the ground, which has facilitated its investment in agriculture and the expansion of its historic cattle ranching business. Starting in 2007, the ranch has planted approximately 500 acres of organic avocado groves, citrus trees and wine grapes. The ranch has pioneered local adoption of water-efficient technology including moisture sensors and a high-density planting method, allowing it to grow crops with one-fourth of the water used by other growers. 

In 2009, representatives from The Rodney Co. contacted the county to discuss plans for developing the tract. Conservationists and residents of nearby communities have opposed development of the land.

In 2022, after 177 years of selling ranch-raised beef at auction, Rancho Guejito launched a direct-to-consumer beef program. The beef is authorized by the U.S. Department of Agriculture to be labeled as "Rancho Guejito 100% Grass Fed [Beef], All Natural,* Pasture-Raised**, Raised without Added Hormones, No Antibiotics Ever. Born and Raised at Rancho Guejito."

References

External links
 Rancho Guejito: A Priceless Treasure - The California Chaparral Institute
 Rancho's future: 10,000 houses? from The San Diego Union Tribune
Diseño del Rancho Guejito : Calif. at The Bancroft Library

Guejito
Guejito
Guej